Andre Wasserfall (born 13 November 1955) is a South African cricketer. He played in two first-class matches for Boland in 1980/81.

See also
 List of Boland representative cricketers

References

External links
 

1955 births
Living people
South African cricketers
Boland cricketers
Cricketers from Cape Town